Lieutenant General Viking Sebastian Henricsson Tamm (21July 1896 – 25November 1975) was a Swedish Army officer. In addition to the years he served in the Swedish Army, Tamm led a group of Swedish officers who developed the Ethiopian military school's officer training (1934–36 and 1945–46) and he was a volunteer in the Winter War in Finland in 1940 commanding the II. Battlegroup of the Swedish Volunteer Corps. Back in Sweden he eventually became Chief of the Army Staff and the General Staff Corps (1948–53) and commander of the I Military District (1953–61) before retiring as a Lieutenant General in 1961.

Early life
Tamm was born on 21 July 1896 in Stockholm, Sweden, the son of the bank director and later finance minister Henric Tamm and his wife Louise Tham.

Career
Tamm was commissioned as an officer with the rank of second lieutenant in 1916 and was assigned to Svea Life Guards (I 1). He was promoted to lieutenant in 1919. Tamm attended the Royal Swedish Army Staff College from 1925 to 1927 and became captain of the General Staff in 1930 and at the Svea Life Guards (I 1) in 1934. He entered the Ethiopian Empire service in 1934. Captain Tamm and the then Chief of Air Force, Major General Eric Virgin, who was employed as the emperor's military political adviser, as well as four other military officers (the lieutenants Nils Bouveng, Arne Thorburn, Gustaf Heüman and Anders Nyblom) entered together into the Ethiopian service to organize the country's only military school for the training of Ethiopian officers. A Swedish military academy for cadets was established in Holeta Genet under captain Tamm who, with his staff, stayed on in Ethiopia after the outbreak of the Second Italo-Ethiopian War despite pressure by the Swedish government to return.

Tamm re-entered into the Swedish Army as captain of the General Staff in 1936 and was a teacher of tactics at the Royal Swedish Army Staff College in 1936. Tamm became major in the General Staff Corps in 1937 and was promoted to Lieutenant Colonel in 1939. During World War II, he was a member of the Finlandskommittén and in 1940 he entered into Finnish service and became commander of the II. Battlegroup of the Swedish Volunteer Corps during the Winter War.

He was a lieutenant colonel of the General Staff Corps and head of department at the Army Staff's Education Department in 1940. Tamm was colonel in  the General Staff Corps in 1941 and head of the Royal Swedish Army Staff College in 1941 and commander of the Southern Scanian Infantry Regiment (I 7) from 1942 to 1944. Furthermore Tamm was Inspector of the Infantry from 1944 to 1946 and was back again in Ethiopian service from 1945 to 1946. He was deputy military commander of the I Military District in 1946 and was promoted to major general and was Chief of the Army Staff and the General Staff Corps from 1948 to 1953. Tamm was military commander of the I. Military District from 1953 to 1961 and was inspector of Kristianstad Higher General Secondary School from 1953 to 1958. He was promoted to lieutenant general in 1961.

Personal life
Tamm married for the first time in 1919 with Katarina Lagercrantz (born 1900), the daughter of the envoy Herman Lagercrantz and Hedvig (née Croneborg). He married a second time in 1938 with Suzanne Kartavtzeff (born 1909), the daughter of the captain Wsevolod Kartavtzeff and Marta von Haartman. Tamm was the father of Annika (born 1920), Per-Henric (born 1922), Hedvig (born 1926) and Kristina (born 1930).

Death
Tamm died in 1975 and was buried at Film Cemetery in Östhammar Municipality.

Dates of rank
1916 – Second lieutenant
1919 – Lieutenant
1930 – Captain
1937 – Major
1939 – Lieutenant colonel
1941 – Colonel
1948 – Major general
1961 – Lieutenant general

Awards and decorations
Tamm's awards:

Swedish
   Commander Grand Cross of the Order of the Sword (6 June 1965)
   Commander 1st Class of the Order of Vasa
  Landstorm Silver Medal (Landstorm-silvermedalj)
  Army Shooting Medal (Arméns skyttemedalj)

Foreign
   Knight Grand Cross of the Order of Menelik II
   Commander Grand Cross of the Order of the Lion of Finland
   Grand Officer of the Order of the Star of Ethiopia
   Commander of the Legion of Honour
   Commander of the French Ordre du Mérite sportif
   Knight 1st Class of the Crosses of Military Merit (with White Decoration)
   Officer of the Order of the Holy Trinity
   3rd Class of the Order of the Cross of Liberty with swords
  Finnish War Memorial Medal

Honours
Member of the Royal Swedish Academy of War Sciences (1939)

Bibliography

References

External links
 Tamm and Swedish officers in Ethiopian service 

1896 births
1975 deaths
Swedish Army lieutenant generals
Military personnel from Stockholm
Volunteers in the Winter War
Ethiopian military personnel
Members of the Royal Swedish Academy of War Sciences
Commanders Grand Cross of the Order of the Sword
Commanders First Class of the Order of Vasa
20th-century Swedish military personnel
Swedish expatriates in Ethiopia
Viking
Recipients of orders, decorations, and medals of Ethiopia